Lucky in Love is a 1929 musical comedy film directed by Kenneth Webb and starring Morton Downey, Betty Lawford  and Colin Keith-Johnston. It was an early sound film, made during the transition from silent films.

Synopsis
Michael O'More is an Irish American living in Ireland with his uncle, a horse trainer for the Earl of Balkerry, where he falls in love with the Earl's granddaughter. After nearly killing a rival for her love, the caddish Captain Brian Fitzroy, O'More flees to the United States. He enjoys success working for a department store tycoon and is offered a chance to go back to Balkerry and establish a linen mill.

Cast
 Morton Downey as Michael O'More
 Betty Lawford as Lady Mary Cardigan
 Colin Keith-Johnston as Captain Brian Fitzroy
 Halliwell Hobbes as Earl of Balkerry
 J.M. Kerrigan as Connors
 Edward McNamara as Tim O'More
 Richard Taber as Paddy
 Edward O'Connor as Rafferty
 Mary Murray as Kate
 Mackenzie Ward as Cyril
 Louis Sorin as Abe Feinberg
 Sonia Karlov as Lulu Bellew
 Tyrell Davis as Potts
 Elizabeth Murray as Landlady

References

Bibliography
 Munden, Kenneth White. The American Film Institute Catalog of Motion Pictures Produced in the United States, Part 1. University of California Press, 1997.

External links
 

1929 films
1929 musical comedy films
American comedy films
1920s English-language films
American musical comedy films
Films directed by Kenneth Webb
Pathé Exchange films
American black-and-white films
Films set in Ireland
1920s American films